Dum and Dummer is a collaborative album by American rappers Young Dolph and Key Glock. It was released on July 26, 2019 through Young Dolph's label Paper Route Empire. The production on album was primarily handled by Bandplay.

Dum and Dummer was preceded by two singles: "Baby Joker" and "Ill". The album received generally positive reviews from music critics and was a moderate commercial success. It debuted at number eight on the US Billboard 200 chart, earning 36,000 album-equivalent units in its first week. The album later spawned a sequel, Dum and Dummer 2, released on March 26, 2021.

Background 
Young Dolph and Key Glock announced the album's release on July 22, 2019, which happened four days later. The music videos "Ill" and "Baby Joker", the singles from the album, were released prior to that.

Commercial performance
Dum and Dummer debuted at number eight on the US Billboard 200 chart, earning 36,000 album-equivalent units (including 2,000 copies in pure album sales) in its first week. This became the first US top-ten debut on the chart for both Young Dolph and Key Glock. The album also accumulated a total of 43.7 million on-demand audio streams for the album’s songs.

Track listing 
Credits were adapted from Genius.

Charts

References 

2019 albums
Young Dolph albums
Key Glock albums
Collaborative albums
Empire Distribution albums